St. Paul's Parish, K Street is a parish of the Episcopal Church in the Episcopal Diocese of Washington. It is known for being one of the earlier Anglo-Catholic churches in the United States.

History
St. Paul's Parish was founded in 1866 with the building of its first church at Washington Circle, where the congregation worshipped until the end of World War II. As a new hospital for George Washington University was planned to be built nearby, the government bought the property and the old building was closed at the end of 1944. 

On new property on K Street, purchased by the church, the architect Philip H. Frohman was engaged to design a new building.  During a prolonged period of construction, the parish worshiped at St Thomas Church near Dupont Circle. The first service was held in the new church in June 1948. Numerous additions of stained glass windows and appropriate religious adornments had been added in the intervening years. In 1966, St. Paul's celebrated its centenary with a liturgy of consecration. On October 5, 2008, the newly expanded parish hall was dedicated by the Bishop of Washington, John Chane. The new parish house incorporated the Gray and Carwithen townhouses that were adjacent to the church.

St. Pauls' sister-parish is St Paul's Church, Knightsbridge in London, England.

Traditions
The first vested choir in Washington and the first "choral service" were led by the first processional cross in the old church. Its "Midnight Mass" of 1870 was perhaps the first in the United States in an Anglican church.  The Eucharist had been celebrated daily since before 1900, with the use of vestments before that. The parish was also one of the first churches to use envelopes for offerings.

By 1935, evensong and benediction of the blessed sacrament was being offered weekly, a practice that continued throughout the entire year until 2019.   

The church is known for its music program. The first organist of the parish, John F. Franklin, began training a boys' choir as early as in spring 1869. Currently, the Parish Choir, a mixed adult choir with a professional core, sings at the 10:30 a.m. Solemn High Mass on Sundays and for various feast days and special liturgies. Boy and girl choristers sing on some Sunday evenings and mornings and other occasions during the year. Previous directors of music include Douglas Birchby, Paul Callaway, Jeffrey Smith (1992-2004; 2017-2022), Mark Dwyer (2004-2007), and Robert McCormick (2007-2016). In July 2022, Monica Czausz Berney was named Interim Director of Music.

Rectors
Following the retirement of the Rev'd Andrew L. Sloane in January 2013, the priest in charge was the Rt Rev'd James Jelinek as interim rector. In May 2015 the vestry of St. Paul's announced the election of the Rev'd Richard David Wall as rector.

Pipe organ
The organ of 51 stops and 66 ranks was built in 1996 by American organ builder Schoenstein & Co.

The first instrument built by Schoenstein on the East Coast, the St. Paul's organ is a standard-bearer of the American symphonic style and is particularly notable for its "double expression" of four enclosed divisions, with two contained within the other two. Its dedication and subsequent recitals have brought renowned organists from across the United States and Europe.

Gallery

References

External links
Church website

Anglo-Catholic church buildings in the United States
Episcopal churches in Washington, D.C.
20th-century Episcopal church buildings
Churches completed in 1948